Oñate may refer to:

Oñati, a town in Gipuzkoa, Spain
Oñate (surname), a surname (including a list of people with the name)
 Juan de Oñate (1550–1626), Spanish conquistador and colonial governor of New Mexico
 Íñigo Vélez de Guevara, 7th Count of Oñate (1566–1644), Spanish politician
 Íñigo Vélez de Guevara, 8th Count of Oñate (1597–1658), Spanish politician
 Íñigo Vélez de Guevara, 10th Count of Oñate (1642–1699), Spanish nobleman